Belk Library, Elon University, North Carolina, United States, is a library for Elon students, faculty, and staff.

Purpose
The library was opened on January 31, 2000, and was named after Carol Grotnes Belk.  The purpose of Belk Library's archives and special collections is to provide Elon students, faculty, and staff access to documentation of importance to their research, dating back to the early days of Elon College in 1889. The archives are the official repository of Elon University's records.

Information
Its roof is composed of an eight-layer hurricane proof material. The library holds more than 300,000 volumes, 32,000 full text journals online, 20,000 CDs, DVDs and VHS tapes. There are 124 networked computers (both Apple and Microsoft) in two computer labs and in the commons area. The library has access to over 150 online databases. In the second and third floors, the library houses 21 group study rooms and the library is open 143 hours per week.

Collections
One of Belk Libraries special collections is the Church history collection.  The collection includes resources pertaining to the Southern Conference of the Christian Church and the Christian Church (O'Kelly) mostly prior to 1957, when the United Church of Christ was forming. The Joseph Wallace King collection is another special collection of the Belk Library.   Elon College received the works of Joseph King in 1996.  King was involved in the cultural communities and art of Virginia, North Carolina, and other parts of the world.  The collection in Belk Library has documents about King as an artist in America and his participation in cultural communities.

Another collection within the walls of Belk Library is the Johnson Signed Book Collection.  The collection was put together by Ruth Johnson, the sister of Oma U. Johnson, a cataloguer of the Belk Library for more than thirty years.  Ruth was the owner of a bookstore in North Carolina.  Belk Library is still adding to the collection today and the majority of this collection is written by southern authors and all are signed.

The Mclendon Civil War Collection, donated by patron of the library and historian Mr. Hugh McLendon, is mostly books describing the Civil War from a Confederate standpoint.

The Moncure Collection contains the entire works of children's author, Jane Belk Moncure.

A collection that contains first edition books from the eighteenth and nineteenth centuries, the Williams-HoneyCutt Rare Books collection, was given to the library by Elon University faculty member and his wife, Earl and Laura HoneyCutt.

An 1854 copy of Walden by Henry David Thoreau and an 1879 copy of Mark Twain's Following the Equator are two of the extremely rare books in this collection.

Donated in 1988, the William Sloan Bible Collection is a group of about fifty rare Bibles collected from all around the world by Elon College Bible and religious education professor William Sloan.

The Elon Authors Collection in Belk Library is a compilation of books authored by Elon students, alumni, staff, and faculty.

References

"Writing Center." Elon University. Elon University, Web. November 3, 2009. <http://www.elon.edu/e-web/academics/special_programs/writing/>.

"Writing Center." Elon University. Elon University, Web. November 3, 2009. <http://www.elon.edu/e-web/library/libraryinfo/facts.xhtml>.

"Writing Center." Elon University. Elon University, Web. November 3, 2009. <http://www.elon.edu/e-web/library/libraryinfo/collections.xhtml>.

"Writing Center." Elon University. Elon University, Web. November 3, 2009. <http://www.elon.edu/e-web/library/libraryinfo/archivesmission.xhtml>.

"Writing Center." Elon University. Elon University, Web. November 3, 2009. <http://www.elon.edu/e-web/library/libraryinfo/archivesmission.xhtml>.

Bowman,Randall. Web Interview. November 2, 2009.

External links
 

Libraries in North Carolina
Elon University
University and college academic libraries in the United States
Library buildings completed in 2000
2000 establishments in North Carolina